Fatehganj is a village in Purwa block of Unnao district, Uttar Pradesh, India. It is located on a major district road and has one primary school and no healthcare facilities. As of 2011, its population is 798, in 245 households.

Fatehganj was founded by Fateh Ali, originally a favourite slave of Almas Ali Khwaja Sarai; Fateh Ali also established a garden and masonry tank in the city of Lucknow, and had trees planted along the Purwa-Basha and Lucknow-Jalalabad roads.

The 1961 census recorded Fatehganj as comprising 6 hamlets, with a total population of 262 people (132 male and 130 female), in 80 households and 76 physical houses. The area of the village was given as 408 acres.

References

Villages in Unnao district